Dodonaea hispidula is a species of flowering plant in the hop-bush genus of the soapberry family. It is native to tropical northern Australia, where it occurs from the Kimberley region of north-western Western Australia, across the Top End of the Northern Territory, to northern Queensland. In Western Australia it is found in the Central Kimberley, Dampierland, Northern Kimberley, Ord Victoria Plain and Victoria Bonaparte IBRA bioregions.

Description
It grows as a shrub up to about 2 m in height. The usually clustered leaves are 15–90 mm long, 8–34 mm wide. The flowers are 5–14 mm in diameter. The ellipsoidal fruits are 2–7 mm long, 2–14 mm wide.

References

External links

hispidula
Eudicots of Western Australia
Sapindales of Australia
Plants described in 1835
Flora of the Northern Territory
Flora of Queensland